A balloon-borne telescope is a type of airborne telescope, a sub-orbital astronomical telescope that is suspended below one or more stratospheric balloons, allowing it to be lifted above the lower, dense part of the Earth's atmosphere. This has the advantage of improving the resolution limit of the telescope at a much lower cost than for a space telescope. It also allows observation of frequency bands that are blocked by the atmosphere.

Balloon-borne telescopes have the disadvantage of relatively low altitude and a flight time of only a few days. However, their maximum altitude of about 50 km is much higher than the limiting altitude of aircraft-borne telescopes such as the Kuiper Airborne Observatory and Stratospheric Observatory for Infrared Astronomy, which have a limiting altitude of 15 km. A few balloon-borne telescopes have crash landed, resulting in damage to, or destruction of the telescope.

The balloon obscures the zenith from the telescope, but a very long suspension can reduce this to a range of 2°. The telescope must be isolated from the induced motion of the stratospheric winds as well as the slow rotation and pendulum motion of the balloon. The azimuth stability can be maintained by a magnetometer, plus a gyroscope or star tracker for shorter term corrections. A three axis mount gives the best control over the tube motion, consisting of an azimuth, elevation and cross-elevation axis.

Missions

See also
Balloon satellite

References

Telescope types